Fotógrafo de señoras is a 1978 Argentine comedy film directed by Hugo Moser.

Cast

 Jorge Porcel
 Graciela Alfano
 Javier Portales
 Tristán
 Adolfo García Grau
 Adriana Quevedo
 César Bertrand
 Stella Maris Lanzani
 Carlos Gros
 Alberto Olmedo

External links
 

1978 films
Argentine comedy films
1970s Spanish-language films
1970s Argentine films